White Butte is a summit in South Dakota, in the United States.

The name stems from the butte's white color.

References 

Landforms of Perkins County, South Dakota
Mountains of South Dakota